The 1958 Italian Athletics Championships was the 48th edition of the Italian Athletics Championships and were held in Rome (main event) from 12 to 14 September.

Champions
Full results.

References

External links
 Italian Athletics Federation

Italian Athletics Championships
Athletics
Italian Athletics Outdoor Championships
Athletics competitions in Italy